2022 Michigan Proposal 1, the Legislative Term Limits and Financial Disclosure Amendment, is a legislatively-referred proposed constitutional amendment in the state of Michigan, which was voted on as part of the 2022 Michigan elections. The amendment modifies term limits in the Michigan state legislature and increase financial disclosure requirements for various elected officials. The amendment passed by a wide margin.

Background
An effort to get a similar proposal on the ballot was initially backed by a bipartisan group which included politicians such as Democratic Detroit mayor Mike Duggan and Republican former Speaker of the Michigan House of Representatives Jase Bolger. On May 10, 2022, the Michigan Legislature voted to place a modified version of that proposal on the ballot, which allowed the group to forgo the signature gathering required for citizen-initiated constitutional amendments in the state.

Contents
The proposal appeared on the ballot as follows:

Results
Proposal 1 was approved with 66.45% of the vote.

See also
 List of Michigan ballot measures

References

External links

Michigan Proposal 1
Michigan ballot proposals
Proposal 1